The Philippines men's national goalball team is the men's national team of Philippines.  Goalball is a team sport designed specifically for athletes with a vision impairment.  The team takes part in international competitions.

ASEAN Para Games 

They have competed at the ASEAN Para Games winning a bronze medal in the 2005 edition.

After their participation in 2005, the team did not join in the goalball event in the succeeding editions until the 2017 ASEAN Para Games. The 2017 ASEAN Para Games team consisted of Jomer Anden, Lemuel Garcia, Jolan Camacho, James dela Cerna, Jefferson Balenton, and Jeff Fernando. The team was led by head coach, Freddie Estacion.

Results

 2005:  3rd

 2008–2015: Did not enter

 2017: 6th

Pacific School Games  

A mixed-sex youth team competed in the tenth Pacific School Games, Adelaide, South Australia, Australia, in December 2017.  Athletes were Shayra Erum, Fionah Mariey Lorena, and Dan Jorens Luzanes.

See also 

 Disabled sports 
 Philippines at the Paralympics

References

Goalball men's
National men's goalball teams
Goalball in Asia